Nicholas Tana is a writer director, actor, and musician best known for the Hell's Kitty movie and web-series.

Life and career 
Before starting his own production company, Nicholas Tana was working at ESPN as an associate director in the international department. Nicholas Tana received much critical attention amongst the horror community through his Hell's Kitty TV Series, about a writer whose love life suffers because of his possessive and possessed pet cat named Angel. Nicholas Tana stars in Hell's Kitty alongside his real cat Angel, and some of the most notable actors in horror, which includes names like Adrienne Barbeau, Doug Jones, Michael Berryman, Courtney Gains, Lee Meriwether, John Franklin, Lynn Lowry, Bill Oberst Jr., Ashley C. Williams, Barbara Nedeljakova, and Dale Midkiff. The film features a guest appearance by a Killer Klown courtesy of the Chiodo Brothers. The Hell's Kitty comic-book series written by Nicholas Tana is based on Tana's experiences living with his very possessive cat named Angel, rumored to be possessed. Hell's Kitty features a host of horror icons often portrayed in parodies of the roles for which they are famous.

Nicholas Tana is also the writer, director, and producer of the sex-positive documentary Sticky: A (Self) Love Story, in which he shared his nine years research findings about masturbation revealing how often an individual is involved in this activity in society.

Music and Composition 

Nicholas Tana is a songwriter with over twenty published songs. He co-wrote the pop song Chainsaw Kitty with composer Richard Albert, which was featured in the Hell's Kitty soundtrack and was an American Tracks award winner. The Hell's Kitty Music Video features a host of well known horror icons who also appear in the Hell's Kitty web-series and feature film.

A musical version of Hell's Kitty was written by Nicholas Tana and produced by Smart Media L.L.C. and New Musicals Inc. where it was performed at the Broadwater Theater as part of the Hollywood Fringe Festival 2019. The original songs for the musical were written and composed in large part by Nicholas Tana,  Alexa Borden, and Richard Albert and was based on the movie and web-series by the same name.

 2018: American Tracks Music Award, Category "Best song for a film"
 2019: American Tracks Music Award, Category "Best film score" (semi-finalist)
 2019: Paris Art and Movie Awards, Category "Best Soundtrack" (nomination)

Filmography

References

External links 
 

Living people
Year of birth missing (living people)
American film directors
American male musicians
Place of birth missing (living people)
Nationality missing